The Simonside Dwarfs, also known as Brownmen, Bogles and Duergar, are in English folklore a race of dwarfs, particularly associated with the Simonside Hills of Northumberland, in northern England. Their leader was said to be known as Heslop.

In F. Grice's telling of the traditional story The Duergar in Folk Tales of the North Country (1944), one of them is described as being short, wearing a lambskin coat, moleskin trousers and shoes, and a hat made of moss stuck with a feather.

The legendary dwarfs of Simonside were mentioned in the local newspaper, the Morpeth Gazette, in 1889, and in Tyndale's Legends and Folklore of Northumbria, 1930. They delighted in leading travellers astray, especially after dark, often carrying lighted torches to lead them into bogs, rather like a Will-o'-the-wisp. The menacing creatures would often disappear at dawn.

The word duergar is likely to be derived from the Old Norse word for dwarf or dwarfs (dvergar), but it may also come from the dialectal words for "dwarf" on the Anglo-Scottish border which include dorch, dwerch, duerch, Duergh and Duerwe amongst others  with the added Norse -ar plural. These Border words for "dwarf", like the Standard English form, all derive from the Old English dweorh or dweorg via the Middle English dwerg.

In the 2004 film Van Helsing, the Duergar are the minions of Count Dracula.

See also
 Brown Man of the Muirs
 English mythology
 Norse mythology

References

Atkinson, Philip Folk Tales of North East England (http://viewbook.at/FolkTalesEngland)
Grice, F, Folk Tales of the North Country (Thomas Nelson & Sons Ltd, London & Edinburgh, 1944) pp130–133
Simonside Folklore

External links
Grice's version of the story of "The Duergar"

Dwarves (folklore)
Northumbrian folklore
English folklore
English mythology
English legendary creatures
Northumbrian folkloric beings